I Love Cinema is a 2004 Egyptian film directed by Osama Fawzy starring Mahmoud Hemaidah and Laila Elwi. A comedy-drama with an emphasis on social, cultural and religion-related problems in Egyptian society، and introducing art as a savior.

Plot
An Egyptian child living in Cairo discovers life and his passion towards cinema, living with his sexually frustrated mother and his orthodox father who believes many things in life are sinful, including cinema.

Cast
 Laila Elwi: Ne'mat
 Mahmood Hemaidah: Adly
 Youssef Osman: Na'eem
 Aida Abdel Aziz: Ne'mat's mother
 Nadia Rafeek: Adly's mother
 Menna Shalabi: Nousa Boushra
 Mohamed Dardeery: School principal
 Edward
 Raouf Mustafa
 Zaki Fateen Abdel Wahab

Awards
The movie was selected as Egypt's submission to the 77th Academy Awards for the Academy Award for Best Foreign Language Film, but was not accepted as a nominee. It gained mostly positive reviews from Egyptian critics and audience and won four Horus Award at Cairo International Film Festival in 2005 including Best Director. It was entered to International Film Festival of Kerala in 2005 and was nominated for Golden Crow Pheasant.

See also
 List of submissions to the 77th Academy Awards for Best Foreign Language Film

References

External links
 

2004 films
Egyptian comedy-drama films